John Frederick Augustus Bond   was Dean of Connor from 2001 until 2016.

Born in 1945 he was educated at Trinity College Dublin and ordained in 1967. After curacies in Lisburn and Finaghy he held incumbencies in Ballynure and  Skerry, Rathcavan and Newtowncrommelin. He was Precentor of Christ Church Cathedral, Lisburn from 1998 until his appointment as Dean.

References

Alumni of Trinity College Dublin
Irish Anglicans
Deans of Connor
1945 births
Living people